Sandro Ghiani (born 12 August 1952) is an Italian film, stage and television actor.

Life and career 
Born in Carbonia, Sardinia, the son of a postal clerk, Ghiani studied in a seminary, the Institute of Don Orione in Tortona in Piedmont, where, with the first performances at amateur level, he discovered his passion for acting. He then moved to Rome, to pursue a career as a professional actor.  Ghiani was mostly active in comedic character roles, often characterized by a strong Sardinian diction. In 2009 Ghiani debuted as a writer with the novel L'angelo della porta accanto, which he wrote together with Susanna Trossero.

Selected filmography
 Zanna Bianca e il grande Kid (1977)
 Velvet Hands (1979)
 Sugar, Honey and Pepper (1980)
 Fun Is Beautiful (1980)
 Passion of Love (1981)
 Asso (1981)
 Fracchia la belva umana (1981)
 Spaghetti House (1982)
 An Ideal Adventure (1982)
 Don't Play with Tigers (1982)
 A Boy and a Girl (1983)
 Chewingum (1984)
 Madman at War (1985)
 Soldati - 365 all'alba (1987)
 Tre colonne in cronaca  (1990)
 Vacanze di Natale '91 (1991)
 Cain vs. Cain (1993)
 Le nuove comiche (1994)
 Non lasciamoci più (1999)
 Zora the Vampire (2000)
 Bartali: The Iron Man (2006)

References

External links 

1952 births
People from the Province of South Sardinia
Italian male stage actors
Italian male film actors
Italian male television actors
Living people